Paterno is a surname. Notable people with the surname include:

 Charles V. Paterno (1876–1946), American real estate developer
 Dolores Paterno (1854–1881), Filipina composer, sister of Pedro Paterno
 Emanuele Paternò (1847–1935), Italian chemist
 Fabio Paternò, Italian computer scientist
 Jay Paterno, Joe Paterno's son and former assistant coach to his father
 Joe Paterno (1926–2012), American college football coach
 Pedro Paterno (1857–1911), Filipino politician, poet, and novelist; brother of Dolores Paterno

Italian-language surnames